A Young Retiree is a 1972 Estonian comedy film directed by Sulev Nõmmik and written by himself and Enn Vetemaa. Together with Viimne reliikvia, Siin me oleme! and Mehed ei nuta, Noor pensionär is one of the most influential Estonian movies from the Soviet occupation era.

Plot
A former ballet artist (played by Ervin Abel) unexpectedly finds himself retired and begins searching for new place in life, eventually becoming a hired tutor of a mischievous teenage daughter of a powerful mother.

Cast
Ervin Abel as Pukspuu, a young retiree
Lia Laats as Mother
Helmut Vaag as Leopold
Leida Rammo as Laine
Marika Samussenko as Marika, the daughter
Lisl Lindau as Employment officer
Einari Koppel as Best Man
Silvia Urb
Endel Pärn
Rein Kotkas
Harri Vasar
Katrin Karisma
Veera Luur
Asta Vihandi
Vambola Helm
Endel Simmermann
Gunnar Hololei
Hardi Tiidus

References

External links
 
 Noor pensionär at Estonian Film Database

Soviet-era Estonian films
1972 comedy films
Soviet black-and-white films
1972 films
Soviet comedy films
Estonian comedy films
Estonian black-and-white films